Luca Sanchez (born 18 March 1999) is a French tennis player.

Sanchez has a career-high ATP singles ranking of 1875 achieved on 4 January 2021. He also has a career-high ATP doubles ranking of 194 achieved on 13 February 2023.

Sanchez made his ATP main draw debut at the 2023 Open Sud de France after entering the doubles main draw as alternates with Théo Arribagé.

Luca Sanchez received a wildcard partnering Petros Tsitsipas for the main draw of the 2023 Open 13 Provence in Marseille.

References

External links

1999 births
Living people
French male tennis players
Sportspeople from Perpignan